Daniel Collette (born 2 April 1985) is a Luxembourgian footballer, who last played, as a striker or defender for Strassen.

Club career
He started his senior career at his former youth club Swift Hesperange but left them for local giants Jeunesse Esch in 2006. He moved again, to Strassen in 2015.

International career
Collette made his debut for Luxembourg in a September 2004 World Cup qualification match against Latvia, coming on as a late substitute for Alphonse Leweck. He went on to earn 28 caps, scoring no goals. He played in 9 World Cup qualification matches.

References

External links
 Player profile - Jeunesse d'Esch
 

1985 births
Living people
Luxembourgian footballers
FC Swift Hesperange players
Jeunesse Esch players
Luxembourg international footballers
Association football defenders 
Association football midfielders